Clinical attachment loss (CAL) is the predominant clinical manifestation and determinant of periodontal disease.

Anatomy of the attachment
Teeth are attached to the surrounding and supporting alveolar bone by periodontal ligament (PDL) fibers; these fibers run from the bone into the cementum that naturally exists on the entire root surface of teeth.  They are also attached to the gingival (gum) tissue that covers the alveolar bone by an attachment apparatus; because this attachment exists superficial to the crest, or height, of the alveolar bone, it is termed the supracrestal attachment apparatus.

The supracrestal attachment apparatus is composed of two layers: the coronal junctional epithelium and the more apical gingival connective tissue fibers.  The two layers together form the thickness of the gingival tissue and this dimension is termed the biologic width.

Periodontal disease
Plaque-induced periodontal diseases are generally classified destructive or non-destructive.  Clinical attachment loss is a sign of destructive (physiologically irreversible) periodontal disease.

The term clinical attachment loss is used almost exclusively to refer to connective tissue attachment loss:https://medical-dictionary.thefreedictionary.com/loss+of+attachment

References

Dentistry